Andre Marcel "Cannon" Gill (September 19, 1941 – December 2, 2014) was a Canadian professional ice hockey goaltender.

Career 
Gill played most of his career in the American Hockey League for the Boston Bruins minor league affiliate of the time, the Hershey Bears, being recalled to the Bruins once for a five-game stand. He later played two seasons with the Chicago Cougars of the World Hockey Association, from 1972 to 1974. He died in 2014.

Career statistics

Regular season and playoffs

References

External links

1941 births
2014 deaths
Boston Bruins players
Canadian ice hockey goaltenders
Chicago Cougars players
Hampton Gulls (SHL) players
Hershey Bears players
Ice hockey people from Quebec
Long Island Cougars players
Minneapolis Bruins players
Richmond Wildcats players
Sportspeople from Sorel-Tracy